The Puerto Rico Ports Authority (PRPA) (AP) is a government-owned corporation of Puerto Rico charged with developing, operating, and overseeing all seaports and airports in Puerto Rico. The Authority is ascribed to the Department of Transportation and Public Works and is governed by a board of directors whose members are appointed by the Governor with the advice and consent of the Senate. Its day-to-day operations are under the charge of an executive director, currently Omar Marrero Díaz.

Seaports overseen
 style="margin: 0 auto"
! scope=col | Name
! scope=col | Municipality
! scope=col | Cardinality
|-
|Aguirre Port
| Salinas
| south
|-
| Port of Arecibo
| Arecibo
| north
|-
| Port of Ceiba
| Ceiba
| east
|-
| Port of Fajardo
| Fajardo
| east
|-
| Port of Guayanilla
| Guayanilla
| south
|-
| Port of Mayagüez
| Mayagüez
| west
|-
| Port of San Juan
| San Juan
| north
|-
| Port of Yabucoa
| Yabucoa
| southeast
|-
| Rafael Cordero Santiago Port of the Americas
| Ponce
| south
|-

Airports overseen
 style="margin: 0 auto"
! scope=col| Name
! scope=col| Municipality
! scope=col| IATA
|-
| Antonio (Nery) Juarbe Pol Airport
| Arecibo
| ABO
|-
| Antonio Rivera Rodríguez Airport
| Vieques
| VQS
|-
| Benjamín Rivera Noriega Airport
| Culebra
| CPX
|-
| Eugenio María de Hostos Airport
| Mayagüez
| MAZ
|-
| Fernando Ribas Dominicci Airport
| San Juan
| SIG
|-
| Humacao Airport
| Humacao
| HUC
|-
| José Aponte de la Torre Airport
| Ceiba
| RVR
|-
| Luis Muñoz Marín International Airport
| Carolina
| SJU
|-
| Mercedita Airport
| Ponce
| PSE
|-
| Rafael Hernández Airport
| Aguadilla
| BQN
|-

Executive Directors
 2017present: Omar Marrero Díaz

References

External links
 

Airports in Puerto Rico
Puerto Rico Department of Transportation and Public Works
Government-owned corporations of Puerto Rico
Transportation in Puerto Rico